"Another Honky-Tonk Night on Broadway" is a song written by Steve Dorff, Snuff Garrett and Milton Brown, and recorded by American country music artists David Frizzell and Shelly West.  It was released in February 1982 as the first single from the album The David Frizzell & Shelly West Album.  The song reached #8 on the Billboard Hot Country Singles & Tracks chart.

Charts

Weekly charts

Year-end charts

References

1982 singles
1982 songs
David Frizzell songs
Shelly West songs
Songs written by Steve Dorff
Songs written by Snuff Garrett
Song recordings produced by Snuff Garrett
Warner Records singles